Kaseta is an album by the rock band Kult. It was originally released in 1989 on LP album through Arston and on music cassette through Bogdan Studio. It was rereleased in 1995 on compact disc and music cassette through S.P. Records.

Track listing
 all tracks by Kult (music) and Kazik Staszewski (lyrics).

 "Oni chcą ciebie" – 5:37 (They Want You)
 "Londyn" – 5:01 (London)
 "Kwaska" – 3:43 
 "Fali" – 7:39
 "Dzieci wiedzą lepiej" – 3:06 (Children Know Better)
 "Jaką cenę możesz zapłacić" – 3:29 (What Price Can You Pay)
 "Tut" – 3:17
 "Czekając na królestwo J.H.W.H." – 6:10 (Awaiting the Kingdom of Y.H.W.H.)
 "Po co wolność" – 3:30 (Why Would You Need Freedom)
Bonus Track
 "Lipcowy poranek" - 9:12 (July Morning)

Credits
 Kazik Staszewski – lead vocals
 Janusz Grudzinski – keyboard, lead guitar
 Ireneusz Werenski – bass guitar
 Rafal Kwasniewski – guitar
 Piotr Falkowski – percussion, guitar, vocals
 Krzysztof Banasik – horn
 Pawel Jordan – soprano saxophone, tenor saxophone
 Roman Kozak – trombone
 Robert Sadowski – guitar

References
 

1989 albums
Kult (band) albums